A reverse vending machine (RVM) is a machine that allows a person to insert a used or empty glass bottle, plastic bottle, or aluminum can in exchange for a reward. After inserting the recyclable item, it is then compacted, sorted, and analyzed according to the number of ounces, materials, and brand using the universal product code on the bottle or can. Once the item has been scanned and approved, it is then crushed and sorted into the proper storage space for the classified material. Upon processing the item, the machine rewards people with incentives, such as cash or coupons. The first prototype of a reverse vending machine was established in 1972 by TOMRA. With nations increasingly adopting policies concerning recycling and sustainability, reverse vending machines have become the standard in areas with stringent recycling policies. To date, there are more than one hundred thousand RVMs spread globally, located in countries including the United Kingdom, Russia, Norway, Sweden, Canada, and the United States.

History 
On 13 September 1920, the first patent for an ‘Empty Container Return and Handling Machine’ was registered in America using a coin return as compensation by Elmer Jones and Sue Walker.  This machine was referred to as a "Bottle Return Machine" (BRM) during that time.  The first working BRM took approximately thirty years from the first patent to be invented and manufactured.  This whole process was conducted by "Wicanders from Sweden," with the machine being used throughout the 1950s.  In 1962, an evolved "Automatic Bottle Return Machine" was established by Aage Tveitan.  After the invention, the machine was manufactured en-masse by the innovator’s firm Arthur Tveitan ASA in Norway and distributed worldwide.

In 1994, a three-in-one machine focused on bottle recycling was conceived by Kansmacker and is still being used today in some states within the U.S.  In the United Kingdom, the Reverse Vending Corporation established the first independent return ready Reverse Vending Machines.  In 2018, RVM Systems paid for the assets and trademarks of the United Kingdom’s top reverse vending company, Reverse Vending Corporation.  Now these machines are standard across the United Kingdom.

Operation 

The operations of the reverse vending machine (RVM) are relatively straightforward in that when the recycler brings the used beverage bottle to the machine, a "receiving opening" is designed precisely to accept the bottles. The opening ensures that the device can take only one container at a time. However, on older systems of the RVM, the recycler has to open a small door on the machine placing the container in a pan before the door closes, with the process being repeated all over again. After that, the recycled bottle automatically turns and is then scanned by a UPC (“Universal Product Code”) scanner. The scanner’s primary purpose is to scan the UPC located within the recycled container. The UPC system is different from the previous methods RVMs used which analyzed the shape and form of the item while using other identification constraints to ensure the container is matched against the system’s database substituting the barcode.

Up-to-date machines utilize artificial intelligence as the contemporary "recognition layer" rather than other identification segments. Aco Recycling is the first company to develop AI Recognition Module for Reverse Vending Machines, machines has been already deployed to deposit and non deposit countries. After the recycled item is scanned and matched to the system’s database, it is then considered an approved item. Recyclable items are quickly processed and crushed to ensure size reduction, to prevent leaks of any liquids inside the bottles, and finally, to boost the machine’s storage volume. In addition, refillable containers are manually handled and returned to the bottling firms. According to a study by the New York City Housing Authority, participants reported that the reverse vending machine was a more flexible option for recycling and convenience purposes. Furthermore, these machines are seen as a contributor to the circular economy as people are motivated to participate in recycling initiatives due to monetary benefits.

Mechanics 
The reverse vending machine attempts to solve the efficiency problem of sorting waste to enhance the recycling process. Reverse vending machines work by permitting the user to insert the recycled containers within a specific aperture inside the machine. Consequently, the machine compresses the bottle to reduce its size and allow more of them to be stored within it before they are collected and returned to the bottling company. After the machine compresses the items, it sorts them for storage purposes, after which they will be delivered to companies responsible for recycling them.

When the machine receives a container from the user, the item is placed in the "loading pad," usually in various forms, including a pan form or a wheel. In the pan form, containers are sorted through the use of the barcode scanner. A particular section of the RVM utilizes software to match the container to the database. There is also hardware that entails an implanted sensor that works hand in hand with other parts to ensure the machine works effectively. Considering the RVM entails an intelligent device that constantly interacts with recyclers, information technology support hand in hand with technical maintenance is usually necessary to ensure efficiency.

Demand 
Waste is being accumulated at a growing pace all over the world, causing the need for new recycling solutions like reverse vending machines. In 2016 alone, over four hundred billion bottles were dispersed globally to consumers, with a little less than half of those bottles being amassed for recycling. With product-focused collection and recycling programs outperforming traditional recycling methods, in states like California or Michigan, governments are increasingly looking to innovate in the sector by adopting government funding grant programs to help supply more machines throughout urban areas.

Locations

North America 
In North America, the adoption of recycling is relatively low; only 9.2% of the plastics manufactured in the United States were recycled. Product-focused recycling and collection programs are being implemented in states like Michigan and California, where reverse vending machines are starting to be implemented.

Europe 

In Europe, Norway is among the leading countries in recycling. In Norway alone, there exists over three thousand seven hundred reverse vending machines and more than ten thousand stations where the trash, including bottles, could be received. Norway offers relatively high monetary incentives for the returned bottles, thus resulting in high recycling rates. Finland is another country with high recycling rates based on the tax for liters generated.

More than one hundred and forty grocery stores owned by UK-based retailer Tesco are planning to add RVMs. Moreover, Tesco has committed to making all of its branded products 100% recyclable by 2025 and spearheaded an RVM campaign set to debut in early 2022.

Moreover, new technological development are increasingly being implemented in Europe. In October 2021, Germany and Denmark partnered with TOMRA to launch the multi-feeding RVM, the TOMRA R1, enabling recyclers to deposit more than one hundred used beverage containers into RVMs in one go. Moreover, TOMRA is expanding its reach as a global RVM leader in Europe and has committed to donating five Euro cents to raise money for vital medical equipment in Apeldoorn, Netherlands, with TOMRA’s first publicly available R1. TOMRA’s R1 machine exhibits higher recycling deposit return rates, achieving 98% returns in Germany and 92% in Denmark.

Other parts of Europe are continuing to adopt RVMs through the use of both public and private joint ventures. For example, the Russian food retailer, X5 Group, initiated a partnership with Coca-Cola in Pyaterochka, Moscow, to supply RVMs in neighborhood areas with high foot traffic. Unilever has also supported the use of RVMs in Moscow in 2019, where they installed seven in Perekrestok and three in Moscow, through a pilot project to promote plastic collection and recycling initiatives, by issuing 10% coupons for Unilever products in the respective storefronts.

As a result, these respective countries’ public and private sectors have partnered to partake in the recycling effort to forego paying extra taxes and contributing to RVM supply and direct investment in the space to get other entrepreneurs involved in the space despite its cost constraints.

In February 2022, an Aldi store in Ireland opened setup a RVM in Mitchelstown, County Cork.

Asia 
In Asia, Russia has illustrated a focus on RVMs with one of its most significant food retailers joining forces with a global beverage producer to enact RVMs in numerous shops across Russia with a discount coupon of 15% to reduce waste in Russia. Russia’s neighbor Kazakhstan has also recently embraced the idea of using reverse vending machines to help in their waste management processes. Finally, India first introduced the RVMs to help recycle containers in 2016. With India's adoption of RVMs, its municipalities identified the top locations for RVMs and broke them into five categories. The first category was close to neighborhoods, while the second category was in supermarkets. The third category was in bus stops, the fourth category in public areas, while the final category was in shopping malls. Having implemented the deposit return system in 2018, Israel was able to collect 77% of the recyclable waste by returning the deposit fee to the end user. Thanks to this system, Israel encourages people to recycle, which is a sustainable project. produced by Aco Recycling constitutes the majority of the machines used in Israel. The fact that it is preferred more with crusher systems and artificial intelligence increases the recycling rate.

Advantages 
The reverse vending machine has several environmental and economic benefits. A person can be rewarded a monetary gain or other rewards by disposing of their waste, such as plastic bottles. This economic benefit is an incentive for people to dispose of their waste correctly. With landfills receiving 27 million tons of plastic in 2018, the RVM attempts to combat this by providing a convenient proper disposal method. The machine’s design allows the user to only insert the item in, and no other action is required. This added convenience benefit enables the RVM to correctly sort the waste, so it does not end up dumped in the environment. One of the focal points of having an RVM rather than a traditional recycling bin is the use of a crusher which allows for a larger capacity of storing waste.

Disadvantages 

Despite the efficiencies found in reverse vending machines, their high acquisition costs are a disadvantage, as machines typically cost more than $6,000. Due to these costs, private business owners typically cannot afford to acquire and manage the machines. As a result, government-affiliated and non-profit interest groups have worked with companies like TOMRA to initiate policies and joint venture programs to promote the use of reverse vending machines to the public. As more corporations and private businesses begin to enter the RVM market, costs are expected to decrease and become a more common alternative to traditional recycling methods.

Aside from an economic perspective, RVMs are subject to constant checkups, updates, and maintenance procedures which enable the artificial intelligence software to continue scanning and collecting data on the recyclable bottles. Despite the convenience that reverse vending machines offer their users, the monetary rewards may be perceived as too insignificant to incentivize recycling from the general public.

Future developments 
Researchers at the Swiss-German University have created a machine that takes both cans and plastic bottles. The device will have an "LCD and push-button installed as well as a commercial beverages database holding a daily log of recycling activity.

The RVM market is expected to grow from $343.6 million in 2018 to over $685.1 million by 2025 as countries embrace waste management initiatives.

See also 
 Circular economy
 Container-deposit legislation
 Plastic pollution
 Recycling

References 

Container deposit legislation
Recycling
Vending machines